Thomas Rowe  (13 August 1913 – 9 May 2006) was an English footballer. He was a member of the Portsmouth team that beat Wolverhampton Wanderers 4–1 in the 1939 FA Cup Final.

At the outbreak of World War II all meaningful football was suspended for the duration of hostilities, and Tommy initially volunteered for the City of Portsmouth Police. He later joined the RAF and trained as a bomber pilot.

Tommy Rowe flew 39 successful bombing missions over Germany. During this time he rose to the position of squadron leader and was awarded the Distinguished Flying Cross (DFC).

On his 40th bombing mission Tommy Rowe's aircraft was shot down over Germany and Tommy spent the last two years of the war as a prisoner of war.

When peace returned to Europe Tommy Rowe continued to serve with the RAF Volunteer Reserve, finally relinquishing his commission in August 1958.

Rowe died on 9 May 2006, aged 92. He was the last surviving member of Pompey's cup-winning side.

Honours won
 12 November 1943 - Acting Flight Lieutenant Thomas Rowe (124836), Royal Air Force Volunteer Reserve, No. 77 Squadron RAF was awarded the Distinguished Flying Cross

As a player

Portsmouth

 FA Cup winner 1939

References

1913 births
2006 deaths
Sportspeople from Poole
Footballers from Dorset
Recipients of the Distinguished Flying Cross (United Kingdom)
English footballers
Portsmouth F.C. players
British World War II prisoners of war
Royal Air Force squadron leaders
British World War II bomber pilots
Association footballers not categorized by position
Royal Air Force pilots of World War II
Royal Air Force Volunteer Reserve personnel of World War II
World War II prisoners of war held by Germany
FA Cup Final players